Peter Taylor Farmstead, also known as Shull Farm, is a historic farm and national historic district located at Newtown Township, Bucks County, Pennsylvania. It encompasses two contributing buildings; the farmhouse and barn.  The main section of the two-story, fieldstone farmhouse was built about 1750.  Additions or modifications were made about 1800, 1842, about 1860, and about 1940.  The modifications done about 1800 rebuilt the original cabin dated to 1715. The two and three-story, frame over stone bank barn was built about 1750 and expanded about 1860.

It was added to the National Register of Historic Places in 1989.

Gallery

References

Farms on the National Register of Historic Places in Pennsylvania
Historic districts in Bucks County, Pennsylvania
Houses in Bucks County, Pennsylvania
Historic districts on the National Register of Historic Places in Pennsylvania
National Register of Historic Places in Bucks County, Pennsylvania